Raintown may refer to:

Places
Raintown, Indiana, an unincorporated community in Hendricks County
Raintown, West Virginia, an unincorporated community in Pocahontas County

Other
Raintown (album), by Deacon Blue

See also
 Rainton, North Yorkshire, England, UK

Distinguish from
 Rain (disambiguation)
 Rain City (disambiguation)
 Rainville (disambiguation)
 Rainberg (Austria)